Cowboy from Brooklyn is a 1938 American Western musical romantic comedy film directed by Lloyd Bacon and written by Earl Baldwin. It stars Dick Powell, Pat O'Brien and Priscilla Lane. The film was based on the 1937 Broadway play Howdy Stranger by Robert Sloane and Louis Pelletier.

Plot
Singer Elly Jordan, a Brooklyn man who is terrified of animals, ends up broke along with his two musical partners at Hardy's Dude Ranch in Two Bits, Wyoming. The Hardys, Ma and Pop, daughter Jane and son Jeff, hire the men to play for the dudes. Sam Thorne, Jane's self-appointed boyfriend, ranch cowhand and amateur crooner, is jealous of Jane's interest in Elly. Elly is so successful as a cowboy singer, that when theatrical agent Ray Chadwick arrives at the ranch on a vacation and hears him, he signs Elly immediately. Chadwick thinks that Elly is a real cowboy and Jane coaches him to talk like one. In spite of his fear of animals, he gets away with the deception. He makes a successful screen test as a cowboy, using the name Wyoming Steve Gibson, but he and Chadwick, who now knows the truth, fear that the deception will be revealed when the movie people arrive in New York from Hollywood with Elly's contract.

Meanwhile, Jane and some of the ranch people are traveling East as well so Sam can sing on Captain Rose's Amateur Hour in New York. Jane tells Sam that she is in love with Elly and Sam is so angry that when he isn't a big success on the show, he blurts out the truth about Elly's background. To prove that Elly is on the level, Chadwick and his assistant Pat Dunn suggest that he compete in a rodeo. They take Elly to Professor Landis, who hypnotizes him. Under hypnosis, Elly leaps on a horse, rides to Madison Square Garden, enters the bulldogging contest and sets a new record. He sneezes and wakes from the hypnosis, but the movie people are convinced that he is a real cowboy. He signs the contract and kisses Jane to seal the deal.

Cast

 Dick Powell as Elly Jordan aka Wyoming Steve Gibson
 Pat O'Brien as Roy Chadwick
 Priscilla Lane as Jane Hardy
 Dick Foran as Sam Thorne
 Ann Sheridan as Maxine Chadwick
 Johnnie Davis as Jeff Hardy
 Ronald Reagan as Pat Dunn
 Emma Dunn as Ma Hardy
 Granville Bates as Pop Hardy
 James Stephenson as Prof. Landis
 Hobart Cavanaugh as Mr. 'Pops' Jordan
 Elisabeth Risdon as Mrs. Jordan
 Dennie Moore as Abby Pitts
 Rosella Towne as Panthea Landis

List of songs
 I Got a Heartful of Sunshine – Candy Candido 
 Git Along Little Doggie – Johnnie Davis and Dick Powell
 Ride, Tenderfoot, Ride – Priscilla Lane with Dick Powell
 I'll Dream Tonight – Dick Powell
 Howdy, Stranger – Dick Powell

References

External links

 
 
 
 

1938 films
1938 musical comedy films
1930s sports comedy films
1930s Western (genre) comedy films
American black-and-white films
American films based on plays
American musical comedy films
American sports comedy films
American Western (genre) comedy films
1930s English-language films
Films scored by Adolph Deutsch
Films directed by Lloyd Bacon
Films set in New York City
Films set in Wyoming
Warner Bros. films
1930s Western (genre) musical films
American Western (genre) musical films
1930s American films